Bernardine Judith Portenski (née Coleman, 26 August 1949 – 1 February 2017), commonly known as Bernie Portenski, was a New Zealand long-distance runner. She set numerous age-group world records, and competed at events ranging from 800 metres to marathon.

Athletics
Portenski took up running at the age of 30, and discovered a liking for long-distance events. She ran 114 marathons, including competing at the annual Rotorua Marathon on 33 occasions. In 1992 she qualified for the Olympics, but was deemed too old by the New Zealand Olympic selectors and was not added to the team.

Personal life
Portenski was born in Lower Hutt on 26 August 1949, the daughter of Mary Coleman (née Caroll) and John Coleman, and educated at Sacred Heart College. When not running, Portenski ran a hairdressing salon in the Wellington suburb of Miramar. She was married to Peter Horan, and had one daughter and one stepson. Portenski was diagnosed with ovarian cancer in May 2016.

Portenski died in Wellington on 1 February 2017 at the age of 67 from the ovarian cancer with which she had been diagnosed the previous year.

Records and achievements
Portenski recorded the following times, titles, and records:
Open
Winner, 2001 Auckland Marathon

40–44 age group
34:48.95 for the 10,000 metres (at Wellington, 1993) – New Zealand age-group record

45–49 age group
17:32.13 for the 5000 metres (at Hastings, New Zealand, 18 January 1998) – New Zealand age-group record
35:35.5 for the 10,000 metres (at Wellington, 1 February 1998) – New Zealand age-group record
2:43:38 for the marathon (at Rotorua, 2 May 1998) – New Zealand age-group record
Winner, 1998 New York Marathon (45–49 age-group)

50–54 age group
5:00.58 for the 1500 metres (in 2002) – New Zealand age-group record
17:22.22 for the 5000 metres (at Wellington, 10 February 2002) – New Zealand age-group record, world third-fastest
36:34.24 for the 10,000 metres (at Inglewood, New Zealand, 21 January 2002) – New Zealand age-group record, world second-fastest
2:51:40 for the marathon (at Auckland, 28 October 2001) – New Zealand age-group record

55–59 age group
2:38.36 for the 800 metres (at Wellington, 22 January 2005) – second-fastest by a New Zealander
17:58.05 for the 5000 metres (at Wellington, 6 February 2005) – World age-group record
37:22.37 for the 10,000 metres (at Wellington, 16 April 2006) – World age-group record
1:24:50 for the half-marathon (at Wellington, 1993) – New Zealand age-group record, world second-fastest
2:59:23 for the marathon (at Auckland, 30 October 2005) – New Zealand age-group record

60–64 age group
18:51.13 for the 5000 metres (at Wellington, 21 February 2010) – World age-group record
39:04.23 for the 10,000 metres (at Wellington, 28 February 2010) – World age-group record
1:24:56 for the half-marathon (at Christchurch, 6 June 2010) – World age-group record
3:01:30 for the marathon (at Gold Coast, Australia, 4 July 2010) – World age-group record

Honours and awards
In 1994 and 1998, Portenski was named Wellington sports personality of the year. Also in 1998, she was named Wellingtonian of the Year, Kapiti Coast sports personality of the year, and New Zealand veteran athlete of the year.

References

1949 births
2017 deaths
People from Lower Hutt
People educated at Sacred Heart College, Lower Hutt
New Zealand female long-distance runners
New Zealand female marathon runners
Deaths from ovarian cancer
Deaths from cancer in New Zealand